West Hockey Association runs field hockey leagues based in the West of England and South West of England. The leagues feed teams into the Men's and Women's England Hockey Leagues and receives teams from sub-regional (county) leagues.

League Structure 
The male league is West of England & South Wales (WoESW) Hockey League (currently the GoCrea8 Hockey League for sponsorship reasons)  and covers fifteen counties. The league comprises 25 divisions across seven tiers of the league pyramid, with the Premiership division at Tier 1. 

The female league is the West Clubs Women's Hockey League, (a separate league association covers South Wales: the South Wales Women's Hockey League.).  The structure consists of a Premier Division 1, with subsequent lower Premier divisions, followed by regional and county divisions.

 Avon
 Cornwall
 Devon
 Dorset
 Gloucestershire
 Herefordshire
 Somerset
 Wiltshire
 Channel Islands
 Carmarthenshire (mens only)
 Ceredigion (mens only)
 Glamorgan (mens only)
 Monmouthshire (mens only)
 Pembrokeshire (mens only)
 Powys (mens only)

Recent champions

GoCrea8 Hockey League Premiership (Men's)

West Clubs Women's Hockey League Premier Division 1

References

Field hockey governing bodies in England
Field hockey leagues in England
Field hockey in Wales
Sport in the Channel Islands
Sport in Cornwall
Sport in Devon
Sport in Dorset
Sport in Gloucestershire
Sport in Herefordshire
Sport in Somerset
Sport in Wiltshire